Agios Theodoros may refer to:

Agios Theodoros, Famagusta, Cyprus
Agios Theodoros, Kozani, Greece
Agios Theodoros, Larnaca, Cyprus
Agios Theodoros, Limassol, Cyprus
Agios Theodoros, Nicosia, Cyprus
Ayios Theodoros Karpasias, Cyprus
Agios Theodoros Tilliria, Cyprus